Scarre is a surname. Notable people with the surname include:

Chris Scarre, English archaeologist and writer
Geoffrey Scarre, moral philosopher